Lincoln City Football Club, an English association football club based in Lincoln, Lincolnshire, was founded in 1884. The club's first team won the major regional trophy, the Lincolnshire Senior Cup, in the 1886–87 season, and reached the last 16 of the FA Cup in the same year. In 1888, the club joined the Combination, a league set up to provide organised football for those clubs not invited to join the Football League which was to start the same year. However, the Combination was not well organised and folded in April 1889 with many fixtures still outstanding. Lincoln then became founder members of the Midland League, and won the inaugural league title. After two seasons the club turned professional and joined the Football Alliance; the following year they were elected to the newly formed Second Division of the Football League. Their highest finishing positionfifth in the Second Divisionwas achieved in 1901–02, and in the same season they reached the last 16 of the FA Cup for the third time. Lincoln failed to gain re-election to the League three times between 1909 and 1920; on each occasion, they won the championship of the league to which they had been demoted, either the Midland League or, in 1912, the Central League, and made an immediate return to the Football League.

In 1921, Lincoln were founder members of the Football League Third Division North, and ten seasons later won the division title, thus gaining promotion to the Second Division, though for one season only. In 1947–48, Lincoln again won the Third Division North title, and again suffered immediate relegation from the Second. On regaining Second Division status three years later they remained in the division until the 1960–61 season, but then suffered consecutive relegations. The club website rates 1975–76 as "by far the most successful season in the club's history". They won the Fourth Division title with a record points total for any division before the introduction of three points for a win, set new Fourth Division records for most wins and fewest defeats, and were undefeated at home, with 21 wins and 2 draws.

For many years, teams finishing at the bottom of the Football League had to apply for re-election to the League for the following seasonLincoln made eleven successful applicationsbut in the 1986–87 season, automatic promotion and relegation was introduced between the Football Conference, the fifth tier of English football, and the Football League Fourth Division. Lincoln finished bottom of the 1986–87 Fourth Division and thus became the first club automatically relegated from the League. They made an immediate return as Conference champions, and until 2011 spent all but one season in the bottom League division. Lincoln reached the promotion play-offs in five consecutive seasons, between 2003 and 2007, but were unsuccessful on each occasion. The 2006–07 season marked Lincoln's 100th season in the Football League; they were the first club to reach that milestone without ever playing in the top division of the League. After a return of only two points from Lincoln's last 11 games of the 2010–11 season allowed Barnet to overturn an 11-point deficit, they returned to non-League football. Five successive bottom-half finishes in the Conference (renamed the National League for 2015–16) preceded Lincoln's return to the Football League as champions. They combined it with an FA Cup run in which they eliminated three Football League teams, including Championship runners-up Brighton & Hove Albion, before a 1–0 win away to Premier League club Burnley made them the first non-league club since 1913–14 to reach the quarter-finals; in the quarter-final, they lost 5–0 away to Arsenal. In their first season back, they made their first competitive trip to Wembley Stadium, where they beat Shrewsbury Town 1–0 to win the EFL Trophy, and reached the play-offs, in which they lost to Exeter City. They achieved promotion the following season as champions, and two years later reached but lost in the play-off final.

Since their election to the Football League in 1892, Lincoln have spent 36 seasons in the second tier, 33 in the third, 40 in the fourth, and 10 seasons in non-League football. The table details Lincoln City's achievements in senior first-team competition from their first appearance in the FA Cup in 1884–85 to the end of the most recently completed season.

Key

Key to league record:
P – Played
W – Games won
D – Games drawn
L – Games lost
F – Goals for
A – Goals against
Pts – Points
Pos – Final position

Key to colours and symbols:

Key to competition:
Combination – The Combination
Midland – Midland League
Alliance – Football Alliance
Central – The Central League
Division 2 – Football League Second Division
Division 3 – Football League Third Division
Division 3N – Football League Third Division North
Division 4 – Football League Fourth Division
League 1 – League One
League 2 – League Two
Conference – Conference Premier
National – National League
Conf. Champ. Shield – Conference Championship Shield

Key to rounds:
Prelim – Preliminary round
Group –  Group stage
QR1 – First qualifying round
QR2 – Second qualifying round, etc.
R1 – First round
R2 – Second round, etc.
QF – Quarter-final
SF – Semi-final
F – Runners-up
(N) – Northern section of regionalised stage
DNE – Did not enter

Details of abandoned competitionsThe Combination in 1888–89 and the 1939–40 Football Leagueare shown in italics and appropriately footnoted.

Seasons

Notes

References

External links
Lincoln City F.C. official website
Lincoln City F.C. archive

Seasons
 
Lincoln City